Our Lady of Gillingham Church is a Roman Catholic Parish church in Gillingham, Kent, England. It was founded in 1888 and built in 1896. It is situated on the corner of Ingram Road and Railway Street, north of Gillingham Rail Depot in the centre of the town. It is a Gothic Revival church.

History

Foundation
Before a Catholic mission was started in the city, local Catholics had to travel to St Michael the Archangel Church in Chatham. In 1888, a mission was started when Fr Thomas McMahon arrived in the town. The mission was supported by the local Arathoon family. In 1890, construction started on a small building that housed a school and church. It was funded by the Fauld family. It opened in 1893 and later became known as McMahon Hall.

Construction
On 12 May 1896, the present church was opened by the Archbishop of Southwark, Francis Bourne. In 1903, he became Archbishop of Westminster and cardinal in 1911. The architect is unknown. The high altar and reredos were crafted by a Belgian craftsperson and donated by Louis Brennan.

Developments
In 1902, the church was extended. In 1934, a new school building was built. It is now called Scott Hall. In 1972, new school buildings were built on Greenfield Road. This meant that only the junior school was left on the old site. In October 1988, more school buildings were built at the new site, and the junior school was moved there. Without a school there, some of the old buildings were demolished and a car park created. In 1990, the church was extended again, this time, with a narthex being added. Between 1999 and 2003, the two halls were refurbished.

Parish
The church has three Sunday Masses, they are at 6:30 pm on Saturday and 9:30 am and 11:30 am on Sunday. There are also Daily masses at 10 am, other than Wednesdays, with two masses on Holy Days of obligation.

See also
 Roman Catholic Archdiocese of Southwark

References

External links

 Our Lady of Gillingham Church on Catholic Directory
 Our Lady of Gillingham on Archdiocese of Southwark

Gillingham, Kent
Roman Catholic churches in Kent
Gothic Revival church buildings in England
Gothic Revival architecture in Kent
Roman Catholic churches completed in 1896
1888 establishments in England
19th-century Roman Catholic church buildings in the United Kingdom